Legend of the Dragon is a 1990 Hong Kong action-comedy film directed by Danny Lee, starring Stephen Chow, Teresa Mo, Bryan Leung and Yuen Wah.

Plot
Chow plays a naive young kung fu student, who leaves his rural home on a small island to find his fortune in Hong Kong under the dubious guidance of his uncle (Bryan Leung), who cons him into using his natural skills as a snooker player for the uncle's financial gain. The film also stars real world six-time world snooker finalist Jimmy White as Chow's final opponent.

Cast
Stephen Chow as Chow Siu-lung
Teresa Mo as Mo
Bryan Leung as Yun
Yuen Wah as Master Chow Fei-hung
Corey Yuen as Cop
Lung Fong as Boss Fong
Shing Fui-On as Fong's hood with Glasses
Felix Lok as Fong's realtor
Chiu Chi-ling as man in crowd at festival
Hoi Sang Lee as Blind Temple Keeper
Jimmy White as himself, the World Billiards Champion
Parkman Wong (Cameo appearance)
Ricky Yi as Hood
Amy Yip as Boutique boss (Cameo appearance)

External links

Legend of the Dragon (1990) at Hong Kong Cinemagic

Legend of the Dragon  review at fareastfilmscom

1991 action comedy films
1991 martial arts films
Hong Kong action comedy films
Hong Kong slapstick comedy films
1990s Cantonese-language films
Snooker films
Hong Kong martial arts comedy films
Kung fu films
Films set in Hong Kong
Films shot in Hong Kong
1991 films
1990s Hong Kong films